Hong Young-ok (born 28 December 1970) is a South Korean sport shooter who competed in the 1988 Summer Olympics.

References

1970 births
Living people
South Korean female sport shooters
ISSF pistol shooters
Olympic shooters of South Korea
Shooters at the 1988 Summer Olympics
Shooters at the 1990 Asian Games
Asian Games medalists in shooting
Asian Games silver medalists for South Korea
Medalists at the 1990 Asian Games
20th-century South Korean women
21st-century South Korean women